Marvin Powell Jr. (August 30, 1955 – September 30, 2022) was an American professional football player who was an offensive tackle in the National Football League (NFL) for the New York Jets and Tampa Bay Buccaneers. He played college football for the USC Trojans. Powell was elected into the College Football Hall of Fame in 1994.

Early life and amateur career
Powell was born at Fort Bragg, North Carolina. His father, Marvin Sr. was a first sergeant and combat medic in the United States Army, and fought in the Normandy invasion in World War II, the Korean War, and deployed twice in Vietnam. Powell attended Seventy-First High School in Fayetteville, North Carolina.

Powell attended the University of Southern California (USC) and played college football for the Trojans. He was an all-conference selection in the Pacific-8 in 1974, 1975, and 1976. He was All-American in 1975 and 1976. He graduated from USC in 1977 with a Bachelor of Arts degree in political science and speech.

Powell was elected to the College Football Hall of Fame in 1994.

Professional career
The New York Jets selected Powell in the first round, with the fourth overall selection, of the 1977 NFL Draft. His teammates voted Powell the Jets' most valuable player for the 1979 season. He was selected to five consecutive Pro Bowls from 1979 to 1983. He was also named a first-team All-Pro in the 1979, 1981, and 1982 seasons. He was named second-team All-Pro in 1980. Powell started 128 games for the Jets.

The Jets offensive line allowed 62 quarterback sacks in 1985. The Jets selected offensive linemen with their first two selections of the 1986 NFL draft and the Jets cut Powell before the 1986 season. He signed with the Tampa Bay Buccaneers for the 1986 season. He played in nine games for Tampa Bay in the 1986 and 1987 seasons before he retired.

Powell was elected president of the National Football League Players Association during his playing career.

Law career
Powell voiced his aspirations for politics, saying that he wished to run for president of the United States. A conservative, Powell worked on George H. W. Bush's 1980 presidential campaign.

Powell worked as an intern at the New York Stock Exchange and spent six off-seasons working on his Juris Doctor, which he earned from New York Law School in June 1987. In 1991, he joined Rosenfeld, Meyer, & Susman, a law firm in Beverly Hills, California.

Personal life
Powell's son, Marvin III, played college football at USC between 1995 and 1998. A fullback, he played in the NFL for the New Orleans Saints, the Green Bay Packers, and the Denver Broncos.

Powell died of heart failure on September 30, 2022, at age 67.

References

External links
 

1955 births
2022 deaths
American football offensive tackles
New York Jets players
Tampa Bay Buccaneers players
USC Trojans football players
All-American college football players
American Conference Pro Bowl players
College Football Hall of Fame inductees
New York Law School alumni
Sportspeople from Fayetteville, North Carolina
Players of American football from North Carolina
African-American players of American football
People from Fort Bragg, North Carolina
Presidents of the National Football League Players Association
Trade unionists from North Carolina
21st-century African-American people
20th-century African-American sportspeople
Rosenfeld, Meyer & Susman people